"I Need You" is a song written by Dennis Matkosky and Ty Lacy. Performed by American country pop artist LeAnn Rimes, it was released on July 25, 2000, as a single from Jesus: Music from and Inspired by the Epic Mini-Series. The song spent 25 weeks on the US Billboard Hot 100 and peaked at number 11, and it was also successful outside the US, reaching the top 20 in Canada, Denmark, Finland, Ireland, Spain, Sweden, and the United Kingdom. A music video was released in 2000.

Background and release
"I Need You" was released as a single from Jesus: Music from & Inspired by the Epic Mini-Series on March 20, 2000, to adult contemporary and hot adult contemporary radio, and it was released to retail on July 25, 2000. The song was re-issued in 2002 by her label, Curb Records, in the album, I Need You, along with the Graham Stack Radio Edit, and included on her 2003 Greatest Hits album. Also in 2003, the song was included on CMT Most Wanted Volume 1. The song was included on her Best of album in 2004 and the Dave Aude Radio Edit was included on the remix edition. A new remix by Digital Dog was featured on Rimes' 2014 greatest hits album, Dance Like You Don't Give a.... Greatest Hits Remixes. On February 3, 2015, it was included on her All-Time Greatest Hits album.

Rimes donated her artist fees and royalties from this song to fund and build a therapeutic rehabilitation wing — the "LeAnn Rimes Adventure Gym" — at the Vanderbilt Children's Hospital in Nashville, Tennessee (Remz).

Although the single was released on July 25, 2000, it was only available as the commercial pop version. The country mix version of this song was not available until September 12, 2000, when Curb featured it on the multi-artist compilation album, "Wings of a Dove".

Composition

"I Need You" is a Christian pop song of 3 minutes and 48 seconds. The song is written by Dennis Matkosky and Ty Lacy and is in the key of G major with Rimes' vocals spanning two octaves, from E3 to D5.

Critical reception
Entertainment Weekly music critic, David Browne, gave it a "C Plus" and states, "This schlock-deluxe ballad finds Rimes in full-diva mode, swooning and growling like a Celine Dion impersonator on Your Big Break." According to Carson James, Curb VP of Promotion, "I Need You" was used as the "primary vehicle for pre-promotion" of the "Jesus" mini-series (Country Corner, 2000) that aired on CBS in May 2000 and was the lead track featured on the album. A review by Billboard stated, "Not since her pop breakthrough "How Do I Live" almost three years ago has [LeAnn] Rimes brought forth a song so naturally beautiful and well-suited to her rich, enveloping vocal style."

Chart performance
In the United States, the song spent 25 weeks on the Billboard Hot 100 and peaked at number 11. The song also reached number 8 on the Billboard Country Songs chart, as well as number 2 on the Billboard Adult Contemporary chart. It received a Gold sales certification from the Recording Industry Association of America for shipping over 500,000 copies domestically. Internationally, "I Need You" peaked within the top 20 in Canada, Denmark, Finland, Ireland, Spain, Sweden, and the United Kingdom.

Music video
The music video for the song features Rimes singing solo in a minimally furnished, abandoned house. The first 2/3's of the video features Rimes in a tan and white shirt with tan leather pants while in the darkness lit by a spotlight that travels across the room in the background while different colored leaves are billowing about. There are close-up shots of her face as she's singing and various poses of her swaying, moving and dancing to the song. After the second verse the spotlight stops in her midsection and the scenes are flooded with light. Then her outfit changes to white but she and the music video continue as before. The video was directed by Joe Rey. On July 22, 2014, as a promotion for her Dance Like You Don't Give a.... Greatest Hits Remixes (2014) album, Rimes released the Digital Dog remix of the music video.

Track listings

US CD single
 "I Need You" by LeAnn Rimes — 3:48
 "Spirit in the Sky" by dc Talk — 3:43

US remix digital download
 "I Need You" (Dave Aude radio edit) — 4:24
 "I Need You" (Graham Stack radio edit) — 3:44
 "I Need You" (Almighty radio edit) — 3:44
 "I Need You" (Lenny B radio edit) — 3:49
 "I Need You" (Lenny B radio edit with intro) — 3:50
 "I Need You" (Graham Stack extended mix) — 6:30
 "I Need You" (Dave Aude mix) — 7:48
 "I Need You" (Bertoldo mix) — 8:22
 "I Need You" (Dataluxe mix) — 9:08
 "I Need You" (Almighty mix) — 6:55
 "I Need You" (Lenny B club mix) — 6:21

UK single
 "I Need You" (original version) — :48
 "I Need You" (Graham Stack radio edit) — 3:43

UK maxi-CD
 "I Need You" — 3:48
 "I Need You" (Lenny B radio edit) — 3:49
 "Sittin' on Top of the World" (Aurora Borealis radio edit) — 4:36
 "I Need You" (video)

European maxi-CD
 "I Need You" (Graham Stack radio edit) — 3:43
 "I Need You" (Almighty mix edit) — 3:42
 "I Need You" (Dave Aude radio edit) — 4:23
 "I Need You" (Dataluxe club mix edit) — 5:45

Charts

Weekly charts

Year-end charts

Certifications

Release history

Covers
In 2001, Anna Fegi released the song for her album, Every Step of the Way. The song was covered again in 2003 by Christian singer, Kristy Starling, on her eponymous debut album. In 2005, Filipino singer Mark Bautista covered this song for his second studio album Dream On.

References

External links
 

2000 songs
2000 singles
2000s ballads
Capitol Records singles
Country ballads
Curb Records singles
LeAnn Rimes songs
Pop ballads
Songs written by Dennis Matkosky
Songs written by Ty Lacy
Songs written for films
Sparrow Records singles